The 1988 United States Senate election in Florida was held on November 8, 1988. Incumbent Democratic U.S. Senator Lawton Chiles decided to retire instead of seeking a fourth term. Republican Connie Mack III won the open seat, becoming the first Republican to hold this seat since Reconstruction.

Democratic primary

Candidates 
 Bill Gunter, Florida State Treasurer
 Pat Frank, State Senator from Tampa
 Claude R. Kirk Jr., former Republican Governor
 Buddy MacKay, U.S. Representative from Ocala
 Dan Mica, U.S. Representative from Lake Worth

Results

Republican primary

Candidates 
 Connie Mack III, U.S. Representative from Cape Coral
 Robert Merkle, former U.S. Attorney for the Middle District of Florida

Results

General election

Candidates 
 Connie Mack III (R), U.S. Representative
 Buddy MacKay (D), U.S. Representative

Campaign 
This senate election was heavily targeted by both parties. U.S. Representative Mack announced his candidacy back in October 1987. President  Ronald Reagan endorsed Mack in June 1988 to allow Mack to focus on the general election, as he easily won the September 6 Republican primary against U.S. Attorney Robert Merkle. In May 1988, MacKay announced he would run for the open seat, and defeated Insurance Commissioner Bill Gunter in a close October 4 runoff primary election.

The general election became very nasty. MacKay tried to portray the Republican as "extremist." Mack attacked his opponent in television ads by connecting him to unpopular Massachusetts Governor and presidential candidate Michael Dukakis. Mack had help from vice presidential candidate Dan Quayle. He also ran ten-second television advertisements that said "Hey Buddy, you're a liberal," a charge MacKay could never escape. The election was so close there was a recount until MacKay conceded eight days after election day.

Results

See also 
  1988 United States Senate elections

References 

Florida
1988
1988 Florida elections